Tim Roberts is a former professional American football player who played defensive lineman for four seasons for the New England Patriots and Houston Oilers.

References

1969 births
American football defensive linemen
New England Patriots players
Houston Oilers players
Southern Miss Golden Eagles football players
Living people